Talasani is a rural commune and village on the eastern seaboard of Corsica. It in the Haute-Corse department of France. The area has very low population density and is mainly forests and farmland. Being a coastal municipality, Talasani recognizes strict urban planning provisions in order to preserve the ecological balance of the coast.

Geography 
Talasani is a village on the eastern coast of Corsica, part of the canton of Casinca-Fumalto. It was once part of the piève, or religious district, of Tavagna. Today, Talasani belongs to the Communauté de Communes de la Costa Verde of Costa Verde, a microregion north of the Plaine orientale.

Town planning

Typology 
Due to its low population density, Talasani is designated as a rural commune within the meaning of the municipal density grid of Insee. It belongs to the urban unit of Penta-di-Casinca, an intra-departmental agglomeration comprising 7 communes and 9,501 inhabitants as of 2017.

The commune is within the attraction area of Bastia, which includes 93 communes, and is categorized as between 50,000 to 200,000 inhabitants.

The municipality bordered by the Mediterranean Sea is also a coastal municipality within the meaning of the law of January 3, 1986, known as the coastal law. Specific urban planning provisions therefore apply in order to preserve natural spaces, sites, landscapes and the ecological balance of the coast. For example, this limits building outside already urbanized spaces on the strip of the coastline of 100 meters, or more if the local urban plan provides for it.

Land use 

According to the European database of biophysical land use Corine Land Cover (CLC), Talasani's land use consists mostly of forests and semi-natural environments (75.5% in 2018), a proportion roughly equivalent to that of 1990 (75.4%). The detailed breakdown in 2018 is as follows: shrub and/or herbaceous vegetation (46.6%), forests (28.9%), heterogeneous agricultural areas (12.2%), urbanized areas (8.3%), permanent crops (3.9%), artificial green spaces, non-agricultural (0.1%), maritime waters (0.1%).

IGN also provides an online tool to compare the evolution over time of land use in the municipality (or in territories at different scales). Several eras are accessible in the form of maps or aerial photos: the Cassini map (eighteenth century), the staff map (1820-1866) and the current period (1950 to today).

Population 

Historical population data

See also 
 Communes of the Haute-Corse department

Notes

References 

Communes of Haute-Corse